The , referred to from hereon as "Kōhaku", aired on December 31, 2010 from NHK Hall in Japan.

This was the last time the Kōhaku was broadcast in analog television transmission. As of July 24, 2011 the digital television switchover throughout Japan will occur, when analog signals (both terrestrial/over-the-air and satellite) will be shut off and rendered obsolete. As such, the 62nd Kōhaku (on December 31, 2011) will be the first time the Kōhaku to be broadcast entirely in digital. The 61st Kōhaku was broadcast in Hi-Vision (high definition) between 19:30 and 23:45, with a five-minute break for news between 21:25 and 21:30.

Timeline
All events listed below occurred in 2010.
October 14
Date and time of broadcast announced. Theme announced as "Bonding through songs".
October 26
The mascots for Kohaku announced Uta♪Ukki-
November 3
Team leaders announced as Matsushita Nao for the red team and Arashi for the white team. This marks the first instance of a group (Arashi) being in charge of a team.
November 17
Announcement of the organizational group and radio broadcasting details on the official Kohaku Twitter.
November 24
Selected participants announced streaming on the internet and on live TV.
November 29
Start of the recruiting for the judges in the audience.

Performers
The singers, announced on November 24, 2010, are ordered below according to the gojūon.
Names in bold letters did not perform in the preceding year's program.

Performance listing

Results
The winners were the white team, making it their 6th consecutive win since 2005 (the last red team win was in 2004). The table below documents the voting and points distribution:

See also
Kōhaku Uta Gassen

References

NHK Kōhaku Uta Gassen events
NHK
K